Leslie "Ike" Atkinson (November 19, 1925 - November 11, 2014) was a US Army master sergeant and convicted drug trafficker. He is believed to have been a major figure in smuggling heroin into the United States from Southeast Asia from about 1968 to 1975.

Criminal career
Atkinson's downfall came in 1975. A shipment of heroin was due to arrive at two addresses in Fayetteville, North Carolina, each belonging to elderly black women. An Army serviceman would come to pick up the shipments, saying it had been accidentally mailed to the wrong address. The plan had worked before, but this time one woman contacted the postal authorities; the other, fearing she had been sent a bomb, contacted the police. The police found Atkinson's palm prints on one of the heroin bags, and he was arrested on January 19, 1975, in his home in Goldsboro. He was convicted the following year and was sentenced to 31 years in prison. Atkinson was released in 2007.

Cadaver Connection
The "Cadaver Connection" was a supposed heroin smuggling operation involving hiding heroin in the American serviceman's coffins. Frank Lucas, one of Ike's partners in the US, stated that this was how Ike smuggled the narcotic out of Thailand:

But Atkinson who used his lifelong friend Leon as the carpenter claims he never used coffins to smuggle the heroin, "It is a total lie that's fueled by Frank Lucas for personal gain. I never had anything to do with transporting heroin in coffins or cadavers."

Prison and release
Atkinson was charged in 1987, while in prison, for his part in another heroin smuggling operation which he was allegedly running from prison. He was charged following a 15-month investigation where an undercover agent, posing as a corrupt German diplomat bought five pounds of heroin on Atkinson's behalf in Thailand. Six other inmates and a correctional officer were also charged. The correctional officer, Samuel Arrante, 36, was charged because he was smuggling the letters out of prison to prevent the authorities from reading the letters. Also charged was Atkinson's nephew, Philip Wade Atkinson, 40, who bought the heroin from the undercover German diplomat at the Waldorf-Astoria Hotel, where he was arrested. Atkinson was released from prison in 2007, and died in November 2014 at the age of 88.

In popular culture
 The concept of smuggling drugs from Vietnam via dead soldiers is referenced in Tom Clancy's book Without Remorse.
 A similar plot was used in  "Back In The World", the December 6, 1985 episode of the American TV series Miami Vice, which Vietnam War correspondent Ira Stone (Bob Balaban), who is investigating a series of drug-related deaths involving methanol, the byproduct of a decomposing drug stash that had been brought back to Miami a decade earlier in the bodies of dead soldiers.

References

1925 births
2014 deaths
American drug traffickers
United States Army non-commissioned officers
People from Goldsboro, North Carolina
Military personnel from North Carolina